= Benefit plan =

Benefit plan may refer to:

- Employee benefits
- Pension plan
